This is the results breakdown of the local elections held in Cantabria on 28 May 1995. The following tables show detailed results in the autonomous community's most populous municipalities, sorted alphabetically.

City control
The following table lists party control in the most populous municipalities, including provincial capitals (shown in bold). Gains for a party are displayed with the cell's background shaded in that party's colour.

Municipalities

Santander
Population: 194,822

Torrelavega
Population: 59,759

See also
1995 Cantabrian regional election

References

Cantabria
1995